The Lutheran Confessional Church (Swedish: Lutherska Bekännelsekyrkan, LBK) is a Christian Lutheran church, originally organised in 1974, with congregations in Sweden and Norway. It has church fellowship with the Wisconsin Evangelical Lutheran Synod.

The church was organised in 1974 when Wisconsin Evangelical Lutheran Synod's pastor Siegbert Becker was called to teach to Stiftelsen Biblicum. The church works in both Sweden and Norway. In Sweden its official magazine is Bibel och bekännelse, which appears five times each year. Its Norwegian version, Bibel og Bekjennelse, appears four times per year.

The LBK is a member of the international Confessional Evangelical Lutheran Conference.

Congregations

Sweden

S:t Paulus församling, Uppsala and Stockholm
Heliga Trefaldighets Församling, Göteborg
S:t Markus församling, Ljungby
Immanuelförsamlingen, Umeå
S:t Jakobs församling, Piteå
LBK i Västerås & Norrköping

Norway

Den lutherske forsamling, Avaldsnes
St Lukas forsamling, Stavanger

References

External links
 Norwegian website
Swedish website

Confessional Evangelical Lutheran Conference members
Lutheranism in Sweden
1974 establishments in Sweden
Christian organizations established in 1974
Christian denominations in Sweden